İmrahor ("stablemaster") is a Turkish word that may refer to:

 İmrahor, Ulukışla, a village in the district of Ulukışla, Niğde Province, Turkey
 İmrahor, Korkuteli, a village in the district of Korkuteli, Antalya Province, Turkey
 Monastery of Stoudios, a Byzantine-era monastery in Istanbul, Turkey later converted into a mosque named İmrahor Mosque

Turkish toponyms